This Machine Still Kills Fascists is the eleventh studio album by American band Dropkick Murphys and was released on September 30, 2022, on Dummy Luck Music. It marks the band's first studio album since ‘The Gang’s All Here’ to not feature vocalist Al Barr who was on hiatus from the band to take care of his ailing mother. It is the band's first acoustic and country album and is composed of unused lyrics and words by Woody Guthrie.

Background
The album was recorded in Tulsa in Woody Guthrie's home state of Oklahoma at Leon Russell's The Church Studio. With Al Barr on hiatus from the band, the band thought it was the ideal time to record an acoustic album. The band had previously put some of Guthrie's lyrics to music, most notably 2005's “I'm Shipping Up to Boston" which became the band's biggest charting single. Guthrie's daughter, Nora, reached out to the band after she collected various lyrics composed by her father that she thought was fitting for the band to possibly record. According to guitarist James Lynch, the band was invited by Nora to go through her father's archives and select lyrics to use.

The title of the album comes from "This machine kills fascists", a slogan that Guthrie used to write on his guitars.By using Guthrie’s guitar phrase for their album title, [Ken] Casey says the band wanted to show that Guthrie's music remains relevant today. What confuses Casey, though, is how the word fascism still triggers some people, despite referring to a large portion of the United States as fascist.  In an interview, Casey said "...it did, but that movement didn’t end with Trump. He set a model that others will now follow. It’s authoritarianism and fascism 101; the press is the enemy of the people, turn people against each other."

Promotion
The album was preceded by the singles and music videos for "Two 6's Upside Down" on July 6, 2022, "Ten Times More" on August 22, 2022 and  "All You Fonies" on September 14, 2022,  "The Last One" (featuring Evan Felker) was released as the album's fourth single and music video on September 30, 2022. The album's fifth single and music video for "Cadillac, Cadillac" (featuring Sammy Amara of Broilers) was released on January 10, 2023. The song was featured as a bonus track on the expanded edition of the album. "Never Git Drunk Again" (featuring Nikki Lane) was released as the album's sixth and final single and music video on February 10, 2023. 

In February 2023, the band released a music video for the song "All You Tories" which was a re-working of "All You Fonies". "In support of all our Union friends in the UK fighting the good fight against the elitist Tory political party we made this music video in association with the RMT (The National Union of Rail, Maritime and Transport Workers). On our recent UK shows we changed the words to the song "All You Fonies (Bound To Lose)" to "All You Tories" in support of the striking railroad and transit workers, nurses , fire fighters, teachers, postal workers, ambulance staff and health workers. Yours in Solidarity, Dropkick Murphys" the band said in a statement that was released with the video.

The band embarked on the This Machine...Tour in support of the album, which was the band's first acoustic theater tour. It began in late October 2022 and concluded in late November 2022.

Track listing

Personnel
Dropkick Murphys
Tim Brennan – guitar, vocals
Ken Casey – lead vocals
Jeff DaRosa – banjo, mandolin, acoustic guitars, vocals
Matt Kelly – drums, percussion, vocals
James Lynch – guitars, vocals

Charts

References

2022 albums
Dropkick Murphys albums